The Château de Chaintré is a historic château in Crêches-sur-Saône, Saône-et-Loire, France.

References

Châteaux in Saône-et-Loire